John T. Whitmore House is a historic home located at Binghamton in Broome County, New York. It is a Queen Anne–style dwelling constructed in 1888.  It is a -story frame residence with irregular massing and brick, half timber, and stucco and shingle exterior surfaces.

It was listed on the National Register of Historic Places in 1986.

References

External links

Houses in Binghamton, New York
Houses completed in 1888
National Register of Historic Places in Broome County, New York
Houses on the National Register of Historic Places in New York (state)
Queen Anne architecture in New York (state)